Phymatopus japonicus is a species of moth belonging to the family Hepialidae. It was described by Inoue in 1982, and is known from Japan, from which its species epithet is derived. The food plant for this species is Pteridium.

References

Hepialidae
Moths described in 1982
Moths of Japan